P. P. Sreedharanunni (born 12 April 1944) is a Malayalam–language poet from Kerala state, South India. His collection of poems titled Khshanapathram received the Kerala Sahitya Akademi Award in the year 2005. His other works include Akasathinte Veru, Uyarthezhunnelppu, Thalappoli and Kavalkkarante Pattu, Aduppu, Nanavu, Para, Sreedharanunniyute Kavithakal (collection of poems), Ningal ithuvare kettathu (memoirs on his service in Akashvani).

He joined as Script Writer in 1969 and retired as Programne Executive in All India Radio, Kozhikode. He also served in Thiruvananthapuram station. He penned about 500 light and devotional songs. He also wrote lyrics for the Malayalam films, 'Samkhupushpam' and 'Vilkkanundu swapnangal'. He got the award of the Kerala Sangeetha Nataka Academy for best lyricist. He lent his voice as Mahatma Gandhi in the weekly radio programme, 'Gandhimargam', for about three decades.

Among contemporary Malayalam poets, P.P. Sreedharanunni has acquired a space, which is both prominent and unpredictable. By not falling in line with any of the currently popular trends of Malayalam poetry his art exhibits bold isolation. At the same time he draws strength from the history of Malayalam versification, from the classical down to the post-modern age. His poetry manifests itself as an elusive mosaic made of myths and urban images, of plain narrative lores turning into formidable riddles, and of silken romanticism in strange company with post modern meta-narratives. When his poetic career started critics soon identified him as a later-romantic. But this rather pejorative label soon proved insufficient to explain his poetry as the poet exhibited growth in multiple directions. Today, he remains an important figure in the contemporary Malayalam poetry.

References

1944 births
Living people
Indian male poets
Malayali people
Poets from Kerala
20th-century Indian poets
Malayalam-language writers
Malayalam poets
Recipients of the Kerala Sahitya Akademi Award
20th-century Indian male writers